The Prevention of Cruelty to, and Protection of, Children Act 1889, commonly known as the Children's Charter, was an Act of the Parliament of the United Kingdom of Great Britain and Ireland (as it then was).

It was the first Act of Parliament for the prevention of cruelty to children. It enabled the state to intervene, for the first time, in relations between parents and children. Police could arrest anyone found ill-treating a child, and enter a home if a child was thought to be in danger. The act included guidelines on the employment of children and outlawed begging.

References

External links
 The Prevention of Cruelty to, and Protection of, Children Act 1889, as originally enacted, from the Office of Public Sector Information.

United Kingdom Acts of Parliament 1889
Cruelty
Child welfare in the United Kingdom